Herman E. Schroeder (6 July 1915 – 28 November 2009) was a Research Director at DuPont, inventor of the first practical adhesive for bonding rubber to nylon for B29 bomber tires, and a pioneer in the development of specialty elastomers.

In 1984, Schroeder received the Charles Goodyear Medal.
DuPont awarded him the Lavoisier Medal for Inspirational Research Leadership in 1992.

Personal 

Schroder was born in Brooklyn, New York in 1915.  He died in 2009 in Greenville, Delaware.

Education 

1936	A.B., summa cum laude, Chemistry, Harvard University
1937	A.M., Chemistry, Harvard University
1939	Ph.D., Organic Chemistry, Harvard University

Publications

References

External links
Finding aids for the Herman Schroeder papers and the Herman Schroeder photograph collection are available at Hagley Museum and Library. Both collections are available for research.

Polymer scientists and engineers
1915 births
2009 deaths
American chemical engineers
DuPont people
People from Brooklyn
Harvard University alumni
Engineers from New York City
20th-century American engineers
Scientists from New York City